Ryan Jay Reyes (born August 10, 1983) is a Filipino-American professional basketball player for TNT Tropang Giga of the Philippine Basketball Association (PBA). Nicknamed D-Energizer for his energetic style of play, he was drafted third overall by the Sta. Lucia Realtors in the 2007 PBA draft.

Amateur career
Prior to his current PBA career, Reyes also saw action in the National Basketball Conference (NBC) and played for the Cebuana Lhuillier-sponsored national team in 2005. He was named the Fantastic Freshman during the PBL's 2007 Conference awards.

Professional career

2007 PBA draft
In August 2007, while studying in the United States, he had to decide whether to finish his last semester of Kinesiology studies at California State-Fullerton or go to the Philippines and apply for the PBA draft. He chose the latter and was drafted third overall by the Sta. Lucia Realtors. Reyes was one of the few pure point guards in the 2007 PBA draft. His great size, athletic ability, solid perimeter shooting, driving skills, general court vision, defensive instincts, ball handling, and confidence in his abilities made him stand out from the other point guards.

Sta. Lucia Realtors (2007–2010)
He was an integral part of the Sta. Lucia Realtors 2007-08 Championship season, won PBA Rookie of the Year honors, and was the only rookie to play in the 2008 PBA All-Star Game. He also won the Sportsmanship award was the first rookie to win Player of the Week (December 17–23, 2007), and Player of the Month (December 2007). In 2008, he was named into the RP Training Pool under coach Yeng Guiao. In 2009, Reyes was a member of the PBA's Powerade Team Pilipinas basketball team that won the SEABA Championship.

TNT Tropang Giga (2010–present)
On May 12, 2010, Reyes was traded to the Talk 'N Text Tropang Texters along with Kelly Williams, just months before Sta. Lucia's disbandment.

PBA career statistics

As of the end of 2021 season

Season-by-season averages

|-
| align=left | 
| align=left | Sta. Lucia
| 53 || 27.3 || .391 || .299 || .769 || 5.3 || 3.5 || 2.1 || .1 || 9.6
|-
| align=left | 
| align=left | Sta. Lucia
| 31 || 25.6 || .390 || .305 || .780 || 5.1 || 2.4 || 1.6 || .1 || 9.3
|-
| align=left rowspan=2| 
| align=left | Sta. Lucia
| rowspan=2|41 || rowspan=2|28.8 || rowspan=2|.390 || rowspan=2|.272 || rowspan=2|.771 || rowspan=2|5.0 || rowspan=2|4.1 || rowspan=2|1.6 || rowspan=2|.1 || rowspan=2|10.5
|-
| align=left | Talk 'N Text
|-
| align=left | 
| align=left | Talk 'N Text
| 61 || 26.3 || .404 || .366 || .683 || 4.3 || 2.8 || 1.4 || .2 || 9.3
|-
| align=left | 
| align=left | Talk 'N Text
| 47 || 24.3 || .393 || .365 || .745 || 3.2 || 1.7 || 1.5 || .2 || 7.8
|-
| align=left | 
| align=left | Talk 'N Text
| 50 || 23.9 || .421 || .322 || .713 || 4.0 || 2.3 || 1.2 || .1 || 7.8
|-
| align=left | 
| align=left | Talk 'N Text
| 39 || 21.8 || .397 || .337 || .667 || 2.8 || 2.1 || .6 || .1 || 4.3
|-
| align=left | 
| align=left | Talk 'N Text
| 19 || 23.3 || .359 || .377 || .750 || 3.7 || 2.1 || 1.5 || .2 || 5.7
|-
| align=left | 
| align=left | TNT
| 41 || 23.2 || .411 || .378 || .805 || 3.9 || 1.9 || 1.0 || .2 || 6.7
|-
| align=left | 
| align=left | TNT
| 57 || 21.9 || .346 || .276 || .694 || 3.4 || 2.5 || .9 || .2 || 4.9
|-
| align=left | 
| align=left | TNT
| 34 || 17.1 || .363 || .333 || .889 || 2.1 || 1.3 || 1.2 || .1 || 4.1
|-
| align=left | 
| align=left | TNT
| 47 || 17.2 || .399 || .371 || .703 || 2.7 || 1.0 || 1.1 || .3 || 5.1
|-
| align=left | 
| align=left | TNT
| 20 || 13.0 || .343 || .294 || .778 || 2.1 || .6 || .9 || .2 || 3.4
|-
| align=left | 
| align=left | TNT
| 33 || 17.0 || .444 || .409 || .857 || 3.1 || 1.6 || 1.2 || .3 || 5.3
|-class=sortbottom
| align=center colspan=2 | Career
| 573 || 22.8 || .393 || .336 || .750 || 3.7 || 2.3 || 1.3 || .2 || 7.0

References

External links
Ryan Reyes Statistics

1983 births
Living people
Filipino people of American descent
Basketball players from California
California State University, Fullerton alumni 
Philippine Basketball Association All-Stars
Philippines men's national basketball team players
Filipino men's basketball players
Shooting guards
Sta. Lucia Realtors players
TNT Tropang Giga players
American men's basketball players
Sta. Lucia Realtors draft picks
Filipino emigrants to the United States